John Alexander Craig (March 26, 1880 – November 20, 1968) was a political figure in Ontario. He represented Lanark North in the Legislative Assembly of Ontario from 1929 to 1937 as a Conservative member.

He was born in White in Lanark County, the son of John Craig and May Camelot, and was educated there. In 1904, he married Alberta Olive Stewart. Craig served as reeve of Darling township for 15 years and was warden for Lanark County in 1921. He died in 1968 and was buried at Hillcrest Union Cemetery, in Calabogie, Ontario.

References

External links

1880 births
1968 deaths
Progressive Conservative Party of Ontario MPPs